WSJC (810 AM) is a radio station licensed to serve Magee, Mississippi. The station is owned by Family Talk Radio.  It airs a Religious radio format.

The station has been assigned these call letters by the Federal Communications Commission since it was initially licensed.

References

External links
 WSJC official website

SJC
Talk radio stations in the United States
Radio stations established in 1957
SJC